Óscar Bruzón Barreras (born 29 May 1977) is a retired Spanish footballer who played as either a winger or a defensive midfielder, and currently managing Bashundhara Kings in the Bangladesh Premier League.

Playing career
Bruzón was born in Vigo, Galicia. A Colegio Apóstol alumni, he moved to CD Areosa before joining Tercera División side Gran Peña FC. After finishing his first and only campaign as a starter, he moved to Celta de Vigo and was assigned to the reserves also in the fourth division.

In the summer of 1999, after only representing the first-team in friendlies, Bruzón was loaned to Segunda División B side Universidad de Las Palmas CF, achieving promotion to Segunda División at the end of the campaign. He made his professional debut on 3 September 2000, starting in a 0–0 away draw against Sporting de Gijón, but injuries limited his contributions during the season to just two appearances.

On 6 July 2001, Bruzón signed a two-year deal with Pontevedra CF in the third division. After being an ever-present figure during his first season, he again struggled with injuries in his second, and subsequently retired in 2003.

Managerial career
Bruzon started his managerial career in 2007, with Areosa's youth setup. In 2009, he joined Celta's youth setup, while working part-time in a bank.

On 4 December 2012, Bruzón replaced Ekendra Singh at the helm of Sporting Clube de Goa. He won the Goa Professional League during the 2013–14 campaign, while also achieving mid-table positions with the club in the I-League. On 4 December 2014, he left the club.

On 15 April 2015, it was announced that Bruzón had signed with Indian Super League side Mumbai City FC as an assistant coach. In October of the following year, he was named Fernando Vázquez's assistant at RCD Mallorca.

On 22 March 2017, Bruzón returned to India and took over Mumbai FC. On 26 June, he was named in charge of New Radiant SC in the Maldives, winning the Dhivehi Premier League, the Maldives FA Cup and the President's Cup during his first season.

On 21 August 2018, Bruzón switched teams and countries again after being appointed manager of Bashundhara Kings. He helped his team on his first season at charge to win all the domestic tournaments and qualify to play the AFC Cup 2019. Bashundhara Kings was recognised at the subcontinent as a team playing a modern, associative, sophisticated and dynamic game style.

He was appointed as the interim head coach of Bangladesh national football team for 2021 SAFF Championship.

Club statistics

Honours

Manager
Sporting Clube de Goa
Goa Professional League: 2013–14

New Radiant
Dhivehi Premier League: 2017
Maldives FA Cup: 2017
President's Cup: 2017
Maldivian FA Charity Shield: 2018

Bashundhara Kings
 Independence Cup: 2018
 Bangladesh Premier League: 2018–19
 Bangladesh Premier League: 2021
 Bangladesh Premier League: 2021-22
 Federation Cup: 2019–20
 Federation Cup: 2020–21

Individual
Maldives Football Awards Best Men's Coach: 2016–17
Bangladesh Football Awards Best Men's Coach: 2018–19

References

External links

Celta de Vigo biography 

1977 births
Living people
Spanish footballers
Footballers from Vigo
Association football midfielders
Association football wingers
Segunda División players
Segunda División B players
Tercera División players
RC Celta de Vigo players
Universidad de Las Palmas CF footballers
Pontevedra CF footballers
Spanish football managers
I-League managers
Sporting Clube de Goa managers
Mumbai FC managers
Spanish expatriate football managers
Spanish expatriate sportspeople in India
Expatriate football managers in India
Expatriate football managers in the Maldives
Expatriate football managers in Bangladesh
Bangladesh Football Premier League managers